Hisaki may refer to:

 Hisaki (satellite), a Japanese space telescope
 A geographical feature in Kagoshima Prefecture, Japan

People with the given name
, Japanese mixed martial artist and kickboxer
, a Japanese poet

Japanese masculine given names